Durissy  is a village in the Léogâne Arrondissement, in the Ouest department of Haiti. It is west-southwest of Port-au-Prince.

History
The village suffered damage during the 2010 Haiti earthquake. The school, just built in 2002, was destroyed. Plans are underway to restore it.

Education
The village has a parochial elementary school, Our Lady of Perpetual Help.

School
The school was founded by Father Anis Yves on October 5, 2002. Digicel contributed the school and furnishings. It also supported teachers salaries in 2008. It is a privately funded community school operating with the approval of the Ministry of Education. It is under the guidance of the Roman Catholic Archdiocese of Port-au-Prince.

It teaches grades K-7. Food is contributed during the school year.

There are 273 students, 105 boys and 93 girls. There are nine teachers.

The following subjects are taught: Math, French, Creole, Social and Experimental Science, and Religion.

There is a board of appointed directors.

Infrastructure
The village has no electricity and no potable water. It receives its mail through Petit-Goâve.

Notes

References

Populated places in Ouest (department)